John Quincy Adams (1767–1848) is the sixth president of the United States. Others with the name include:

 John Quincy Adams II (1833–1894), American lawyer and politician, grandson of the president
 John Quincy Adams (1848–1919), employee of the Milwaukee Road Railroad, namesake of Adams County, North Dakota 
 John Quincy Adams (painter) (1874–1933), Austrian genre and portrait painter of American ancestry
 John Quincy Adams (editor) (1848–1922), proprietor of The Appeal newspaper
 John Quincy Adams (train), a train of the New York, New Haven & Hartford Railroad
 John Quincy Adams (Wisconsin politician) (1816 –1895), state politician

Adams, John Quincy